Ron Boys (10 September 1924 – 20 October 1990) was a former Australian rules footballer who played with Carlton and Hawthorn in the Victorian Football League (VFL).

Notes

External links 

Ron Boys' statistics from AFL Tables
Ron Boys' profile at Blueseum

1924 births
Carlton Football Club players
Hawthorn Football Club players
Australian rules footballers from Victoria (Australia)
Northcote Football Club players
1990 deaths